Peter Townsend is an American drummer from Louisville, Kentucky now living in Nashville, Tennessee. He has recorded and performed with Will Oldham in the bands Palace, Superwolf and Bonnie "Prince" Billy. He has also been featured on recordings and tours with King Kong, Nathan Bell, Human Bell, Nicolai Dunger, David Pajo, Brightblack Morning Light and many others.

Discography

Palace Music
The Mountain (EP)
Lost Blues and Other Songs

Bonnie "Prince" Billy
I See a Darkness
Summer in the Southeast
Superwolf

Singles
 "I Am Drinking Again"
 "We All, Us Three, Will Ride" / "Barcelona"
 "Cold and Wet"
 "I Gave You"
 "Love in the Hot Afternoon"
 "Hombre Sencillo"
 "Must Be Blind" / "Life in Muscle"
 "There Is No God" / "God Is Love"
 "Christmas Eve Can Kill You" / "Lovey Kravezit"

Cross
"Die Forever"

King Kong
 Buncha Beans

Nathan Bell
 Colors
 Rain Music

Compilation
 Musique Pour Statues Menhirs

Human Bell
 Human Bell

Nicolai Dunger
 Tranquil Isolations

Brightblack Morning Light
 "Another Reclamation" (Live) split 7-inch with Lungfish

Speed to Roam
"Space Killer" 
Speed to Roam
Later Days 
Devils and Ghosts

Warmer Milks
 Emblem (cassette)

Anna Ternheim
The Night Visitor

Notes

External links
 

Place of birth missing (living people)
Year of birth missing (living people)
Living people
American drummers
American session musicians
Musicians from Louisville, Kentucky